José Francisco Moreira dos Santos  (12 October 1928 – 16 March 2023) was a Portuguese Catholic bishop.

Ordained to the priesthood on 20 January 1952, Moreira dos Santos was named bishop of Diocese of Uíje, Angola in 1967 and retired on 2 February 2008.

References 

1928 births
2023 deaths
People from Leiria District
Portuguese expatriates in Angola
Portuguese Roman Catholic bishops
Roman Catholic bishops of Uíje
Bishops appointed by Pope Paul VI
Capuchin bishops